Vicente Javier "Xavi" Torres Ramis (born 14 June 1974 in Palma de Mallorca, Balearic Islands) is an S5 swimmer from Spain.

Personal 
Torres was born on 14 June 1974 in Palma de Mallorca, Balearic Islands. In May 2012, he was a presenter at the International Film Festival Maremostra Ocea. In November 2013, he participated in a program run by the Programa ADOP Empleo to train Paralympic athletes in developing business communication and entrepreneurship skills.

Swimming 
Torres is an S5/SM4  swimmer from Spain.  He has held four world records in his classification.

In 2010, Torres competed at the Tenerife International Open.  Before the 2010 IPC Swimming World Championship in the Netherlands, he went to a swimming camp with the national team that was part of the Paralympic High Performance Program (HARP Program).  Eindhoven, Netherlands hosted  the 2010 World Swimming Championships at which he competed.  He qualified for the 50 meter breaststroke finals after posting the eighth best qualifying time.  He finished seventh overall. In the 50 meter butterfly, he finished tenth after failing to qualify for the finals. He was one of four Spanish swimmers at the World Championships that were affiliated with CTEIB, an institute created by the Government of the Balearic Islands intended to provide an education to elite high-performance sportspeople. He set a minimum Spanish qualifying time for the London Paralympic Games at the  Son Hugo Municipal Swimming Pool in February 2012. In May 2012, he trained in Palma de Mallorca, in the Balearic Islands.

Paralympics 
Torres competed at the 1992 Sumner Paralympics 1996 Summer Paralympics, 2000 Summer Paralympics,  2004 Summer Paralympics,  2008 Summer Paralympics and  2012 Summer Paralympics. In 1992 he won 2 goles, 2 silver and 1 bronze. In 1996, he won a gold medal in the 150 meter individual medley, a silver in the 4 x 50 meters 20 point freestyle relay and a bronze in the 4 x 50 meters 20 point medley relay. In 2000, he finished first in the 150 meter individual medley, in the 4 x 50 meters 20 point freestyle relay and in the 4 x 50 meters 20 point medley relay.  In 2000, he won a bronze in the 50 meter breaststroke.  In 2004, he won a silver in the 150 meter individual medley and a bronze in the 4 x 50 meters 20 point medley relay.  In 2008, he won a silver medal in the 150 meter individual medley.

References

External links 
  (1998)
  (1992–2004)
  (2002–2012)
 

1974 births
Living people
Spanish male breaststroke swimmers
Spanish male butterfly swimmers
Spanish male medley swimmers
Paralympic swimmers of Spain
Paralympic gold medalists for Spain
Paralympic silver medalists for Spain
Paralympic bronze medalists for Spain
Paralympic medalists in swimming
Swimmers at the 1996 Summer Paralympics
Swimmers at the 2000 Summer Paralympics
Swimmers at the 2004 Summer Paralympics
Swimmers at the 2008 Summer Paralympics
Swimmers at the 2012 Summer Paralympics
Medalists at the 1996 Summer Paralympics
Medalists at the 2000 Summer Paralympics
Medalists at the 2004 Summer Paralympics
Medalists at the 2008 Summer Paralympics
Medalists at the World Para Swimming Championships
Medalists at the World Para Swimming European Championships
Sportspeople from Palma de Mallorca
S5-classified Paralympic swimmers